Roma Esporte de Apucarana, usually known simply as Roma, is a Brazilian football team from the city of Apucarana, Paraná state, founded on December 14, 2000.

History
On December 6, 2000, the club was founded in Barueri, São Paulo state by João Wilson Antonini with the help of Roma Incorporadora enterprise's investment. The club later made a partnership with Apucarana city hall and then moved to that city.

References

Association football clubs established in 2000
Football clubs in Paraná (state)
2000 establishments in Brazil